Acicys is a genus of moths of the family Crambidae. It contains only one species, Acicys cladaropa, which is found in Australia.

References

Spilomelinae
Taxa named by Alfred Jefferis Turner
Monotypic moth genera
Moths of Australia
Crambidae genera